The Australian International School is a private school in Sharjah, UAE. Students graduate at the end of grade 12 with either a Queensland Certificate of Education or an International Baccalaureate Diploma.

AIS was established in September 2005 via a partnership between Al Sharif Investment Trading Group and the Government of Queensland, Australia.

References

Sharjah
Schools in Sharjah (city)